The following sortable table comprises the 230 mountain peaks of greater North America with at least  of topographic isolation and at least  of topographic prominence.

The summit of a mountain or hill may be measured in three principal ways:
The topographic elevation of a summit measures the height of the summit above a geodetic sea level.
The topographic prominence of a summit is a measure of how high the summit rises above its surroundings.
The topographic isolation (or radius of dominance) of a summit measures how far the summit lies from its nearest point of equal elevation.

Four major summits of greater North America exceed , eight exceed , 35 exceed , 107 exceed , the following 230 major summits exceed , and 413 exceed  of topographic isolation.



Major 100-kilometer summits

Of these 230 major 100-kilometer summits of North America, 103 are located in the United States (excluding four in Hawaii), 50 in Canada, 33 in México, 21 in Greenland, four in Honduras, three in Cuba, two in Guatemala, two in Haiti, two in Panamá, and one each in the Dominican Republic, Costa Rica, Guadeloupe, Puerto Rico, Jamaica, Saint Kitts and Nevis, Saint Vincent and the Grenadines, Trinidad and Tobago, Nicaragua, Belize, Grenada, and the British Virgin Islands.  Two of these peaks lie on the Canada-United States border and one lies on the Nicaragua-Honduras border.

Gallery

See also

North America
Geography of North America
Geology of North America
Lists of mountain peaks of North America
List of mountain peaks of North America
List of the highest major summits of North America
List of the highest islands of North America
List of Ultras of North America

List of extreme summits of North America
List of mountain peaks of Greenland
List of mountain peaks of Canada
List of mountain peaks of the Rocky Mountains
List of mountain peaks of the United States
List of mountain peaks of México
List of mountain peaks of Central America
List of mountain peaks of the Caribbean
:Category:Mountains of North America
commons:Category:Mountains of North America
Physical geography
Topography
Topographic elevation
Topographic prominence
Topographic isolation

Notes

References

External links

Natural Resources Canada (NRC)
Canadian Geographical Names @ NRC
United States Geological Survey (USGS)
Geographic Names Information System @ USGS
United States National Geodetic Survey (NGS)
Geodetic Glossary @ NGS
NGVD 29 to NAVD 88 online elevation converter @ NGS
Survey Marks and Datasheets @ NGS
Instituto Nacional de Estadística, Geografía e Informática (INEGI)
Sistemas Nacionales Estadístico y de Información Geográfica (SNEIG)
Bivouac.com
Peakbagger.com
Peaklist.org
Peakware.com
Summitpost.org

 

Geography of North America

North America, List Of The Major 100-Kilometer Summits Of
North America, List Of The Major 100-Kilometer Summits Of